The Flora Garden is a flower garden in São Lázaro, Macau. The garden is located at the foothill of Guia Hill. It is Macau's largest public park.

History
The garden used to be the ground for Flora Palace, a mansion during the Portuguese Macau era.

Attractions
The garden consists of an aviary, small zoo and patio. It also has flowerbeds, small waterfalls and belvedere.

See also
 List of tourist attractions in Macau

References

Urban public parks in Macau
Gardens in Macau
Biota of Macau